The Moose Horn River is a  tributary of the Kettle River in eastern Minnesota, United States. It is part of the St. Croix River watershed, flowing eventually to the Mississippi River. The river passes the communities of Mahtowa, Barnum, and Moose Lake, ending at the Kettle River southwest of the city of Sturgeon Lake.

See also
List of rivers of Minnesota
List of longest streams of Minnesota

References

Minnesota Watersheds
USGS Hydrologic Unit Map - State of Minnesota (1974)

Rivers of Minnesota
Tributaries of the Mississippi River
Rivers of Carlton County, Minnesota